How We Decide, is a 2009 book by journalist Jonah Lehrer, that provides biological explanations of how people make decisions and offers suggestions for making better decisions. It is published as The Decisive Moment: How the Brain Makes Up Its Mind in the United Kingdom.

On March 1, 2013, following revelations that Lehrer has been caught in numerous falsifications in his œuvre of writings, Houghton Mifflin Harcourt announced the book was taken "off sale" after an internal review.

Summary
Sections/chapters of the book are titled as follows:
 Introduction
 The Quarterback in the Pocket
 The Predictions of Dopamine
 Fooled by a Feeling
 The Uses of Reason
 Choking on Thought
 The Moral Mind
 The Brain Is an Argument
 The Poker Hand
 Coda

See also
Similarly themed books include:
 Proust Was a Neuroscientist
 Imagine: How Creativity Works
 Made to Stick
 Microtrends
 Think!: Why Crucial Decisions Can't Be Made in the Blink of an Eye
 Thinking, Fast and Slow
 Thinking Strategically

References

External links 
 Powells books references commercial reviews
 Los Angeles Times review
 Time Magazine review
 “And Now Jonah Lehrer’s Second Book Is Being Pulled From Stores”
 “Publisher Pulls Jonah Lehrer’s ‘How We Decide’ From Stores”

2009 non-fiction books
American non-fiction books
Popular psychology books
Books about creativity
Houghton Mifflin books
Recalled publications
Books by Jonah Lehrer